Ron Horton (born 1960 in Bethesda, Maryland) is an American jazz trumpeter.

Biography
Horton attended Berklee College of Music from 1978 to 1980. In 1982, he moved to New York City, where, as a longtime member of Jane Ira Bloom's band (1983-2000), he became an integral part of the jazz scene. He has also been a member of the New York Jazz Composers Collective since 1992 and the Herbie Nichols Project under Frank Kimbrough and Ben Allison. From 1998 to 2003 he was also a member of Andrew Hill's sextet, on his album Dusk (1999).

Horton worked as a sideman with Ted Nash, Allan Chase, Bill Mays, Jon Gordon, Andy Laster, Phillip Johnston, Matt Wilson, Roberta Piket, Rez Abbasi, Walter Thompson, Pete Malinverni, Jamie Baum, Bill Gerhardt, Rich Rosenzweig, John McKenna, Michael Jefry Stevens, Peggy Stern and others. In 1999, he released his first CD as a bandleader.

Horton also has given master classes and workshops at The New School in New York, the New England Conservatory of Music, the University of North Carolina, and Oxford University.

Discography
Genius Envy with Jane Ira Bloom, John McKenna, Frank Kimbrough, Ben Allison, Rich Rosenzweig, 1999, OmniTone
Subtextures with Frank Kimbrough, Ben Allison, Matt Wilson, 2002
Everything In a Dream with John O'Gallagher, Tony Malaby, Frank Kimbrough, Michael Sarin, Masa Kamaguchi, John Hébert, 2005, Fresh Sound
With Jane Ira Bloom
 Art and Aviation (Arabesque, 1992)

Further reading
"Ron Horton". The New Grove Dictionary of Jazz. 2nd edition, 2001, ed. Barry Kernfeld.

American jazz trumpeters
American male trumpeters
Jazz musicians from Maryland
American male jazz musicians